Rainer Werner Fassbinder (31 May 1945 – 10 June 1982) was a German filmmaker.

Filmography
All titles written and directed by Rainer Werner Fassbinder unless stated otherwise. According to Hanna Schygulla, Fassbinder had no part in the making of Why Does Herr R. Run Amok?; it was realized from his idea by Michael Fengler, his assistant.

Films about Fassbinder
 Rainer Werner Fassbinder (1977) – German documentary made by Florian Hopf and Maximiliane Mainka. (29 minutes)
 Life Stories: A Conversation with RWF (German title: Lebensläufe - Rainer Werner Fassbinder im Gespräch, 1978) – German TV documentary made by Peter W. Jansen as part of a regular series. Contains an in-depth interview given by RWF in his Paris home. Originally aired on 18 March 1978. (48 minutes)
 RWF Last Works (German title: RWF Letzte Arbeiten, 1982) - German TV documentary made by Wolf Gremm during the shooting of Kamikaze 1989 and Querelle.
 Room 666 (German title: Chambre 666, 1982) – Along with a number of his peers, Fassbinder participated in this Wim Wenders documentary project. (50 minutes)
  (German title: Ein Mann wie E.V.A., 1984) – Eva Mattes plays a fictionalized version of Fassbinder in this film directed by Radu Gabrea.(92 minutes) 
 I Don't Just Want You to Love Me (1992) – German feature-length documentary on Fassbinder's career. (90 minutes)
 The Women of Fassbinder (German title: Frauen über R. W. Fassbinder 1992) – German television documentary made by Thomas Honickel. Margit Carstensen, Irm Hermann, Hanna Schygulla and (briefly) Rosel Zech are interviewed. (60 minutes)
 The Many Women of Fassbinder (1997)
 Life, Love and Celluloid (1998) – English language documentary film by Juliane Lorenz centring on the 1997 Museum of Modern Art retrospective in New York. Gottfried John and Günter Lamprecht are featured. (90 minutes)
 Fassbinder in Hollywood (2002) – Documentary made by Robert Fischer (mainly in English) and co-written by Ulli Lommel, who also appears. Michael Ballhaus, Hanna Schygulla and Wim Wenders are interviewed. (57 minutes)
 Fassbinder's Women (2005) – French thematic anthology of film clips. (25 minutes)
 Enfant Terrible, 2020 film directed by Oskar Roehler

References
 Rainer Werner Fassbinder. filmportal.de.

Filmography
Director filmographies
German filmographies
Male actor filmographies